The list of shipwrecks in March 1820 includes ships sunk, wrecked or otherwise lost during March 1820.

1 March

2 March

3 March

4 March

5 March

7 March

9 March

11 March

12 March

13 March

14 March

15 March

16 March

18 March

20 March

24 March

25 March

26 March

27 March

29 March

31 March

Unknown date

References

1820-03